is a Japanese curler. She was the skip of Team Fujikyu.

Career
In 2017–2018 season, Koana played as skip, she would win a gold medal at the 2018 Japan Women's Curling Championships,.
Koana skipped the Japanese team at the 2018 Ford World Women's Curling Championship finishing in 10th. She represented Japan at the third leg of the 2018–19 Curling World Cup, finishing with a 2-4 record.

To begin the 2019-20 curling season, Koana won the Morioka City Women's Memorial Cup and finished runner-up at the 2019 Cargill Curling Training Centre Icebreaker.

Personal life
Koana worked as an amusement park employee for Fujikyu Highland Co., Ltd. until 2022.

Teams

Grand Slam record

References

External links

Living people
1995 births
Japanese female curlers
Sportspeople from Yamanashi Prefecture
20th-century Japanese women
21st-century Japanese women